Medea is a 2005 Dutch television serial in six episodes directed by Theo van Gogh, starring Katja Schuurman, Thijs Römer and Tara Elders. It tells the story of the daughter of a politician who tries to help her selfish boyfriend to become the prime minister of the Netherlands.

The screenplay was written by Theodor Holman and is a take on Euripides' play Medea, with the story moved to contemporary Dutch politics. The serial was produced by Column Film for the broadcaster AVRO.

It won the Special Prize and was nominated for the Golden Calf for Best Television Drama at the 2005 Netherlands Film Festival.

Cast
 Katja Schuurman as Medea
 Thijs Römer as Jason
 Tara Elders as Anne
 Krijn ter Braak as Moyra
 Cas Enklaar as Middelink
 Jochum ten Haaf as Frederik
 Maarten Wansink as Jensma
 Marcel Hensema as Matthijs
 Eric van Sauers as Robin
 Dragan Bakema as Thomas
 Cees Geel as Bertje
 Astrid van Eck as Xandra
 Monic Hendrickx as de Vries

References

External links
 Official website 

2005 Dutch television series debuts
2000s Dutch television series
Dutch drama television series
Works based on Medea (Euripides play)
Films directed by Theo van Gogh
Political drama television series
2000s television miniseries
Dutch television miniseries
Modern adaptations of works by Euripides
NPO 3 original programming